Beichuan Qiang Autonomous County (Qiang: Juda Rrmea nyujugvexueaji xae) is a county under the jurisdiction of Mianyang City in northern Sichuan province, China. It is located in an ethnically diverse mountainous region of Sichuan. Its Chinese name literally means "North" (bei) "River" (chuan). Its new county seat is located at Yongchang after the 2008 Sichuan earthquake.

Geography
The county varies in elevation from 540 to 4,769 meters in height.

History and culture
The first administrative county of Beichuan was set up in 564 A.D. during the Northern Zhou dynasty. The Tang dynasty first created another county, Shiquan inside the original Beichuan county in 634 A.D., then in 651 A.D. merged Beichuan county into Shiquan. The Republic of China changed the county name back to Beichuan in 1914 because there had been a Shiquan county in Shaanxi province before 564 A.D.

In 1988, the China granted Beichuan county the status of Qiang autonomy. The Beichuan Qiang Autonomous County was formally created on July 6, 2003.

Claim to Yu the Great
Beichuan was the first county in Sichuan to make the claim as the birthplace of Yu the Great, founder of the Xia dynasty and traditionally regarded as the first hereditary sovereign in Chinese history.
Although this claim is probably more commercial than historical, Beichuan was part of West Qiang that some ancient records accredited as Yu's birthplace, just like the other three locations in Sichuan, namely Wenchuan, Dujiangyan, and Shifang, that raised similar claims.
Many places in other parts of China have made similar claims.

Great Sichuan Earthquake

Also like the other three counties and towns in Sichuan holding claims to be the birthplace of Yu the Great, Beichuan is among the most severely hit of all disaster regions following the 2008 Sichuan earthquake, including the Beichuan High School campus, where more than 1,000 students lost their lives after two main buildings collapsed.
Beichuan's Party and government building also collapsed, and Yang Zesen, Beichuan's vice mayor then was among the victims. 80% of the county's buildings are said to have collapsed.

The county town, which prior to the earthquake had a population of 20,000, is to be made into a memorial park, as the site has been deemed too vulnerable. The survivors of the quake have been relocated.

The earthquake also caused a landslide on Mount Tangjia which dammed the Jian River and created the Tangjiashan Quake Lake. The lake was once in danger of causing the Tangjiashan Dam to collapse and catastrophically flood downstream communities, totalling over a million persons. On June 10, 2008, the lake spilled through an artificially constructed sluice channel and flooded the evacuated town. No casualties were caused.

Beichuan was at the center of one of two zones where seismic intensity were the highest at XI liedu during this earthquake and its aftershocks.  Since the earthquake, the central government has increased fortification intensity for seismic design for the old county town from VI to VIII.

Administrative divisions
Beichuan County has 9 towns, 9 townships, and 1 ethnic township.

Towns:
Yongchang, Sichuan

Xiaoba, Beichuan County
Ethnic Township:

Townships:

Demographics 
Beichuan County had a population of 235,304 in 2017, of which 61.5% are Han Chinese, 36.6% of which are Qiang people (a Sino-Tibetan people related to Tibetans), 1.5% are Tibetans, 0.2% are Hui, and the remaining 0.2% belong to various other ethnic groups.

Education
The county is home to 34 standard schools, of which, 24 are primary schools, 9 junior high schools, and 1 compulsory school.

Beichuan also houses the Beichuan Red Army Elementary School.

Climate

References

External links

Official website of Beichuan County 

 
County-level divisions of Sichuan
Qiang autonomous counties
Mianyang